Zagar may refer to:

 Zagăr
 Žagar (disambiguation)